Mihajlovski is the Macedonianization of the Bulgarian surname Mihailov, meaning 'of Mihajlo' (English: Michael). 

It may refer to:

Ana Mihajlovski (born 1982) Serbian TV presenter
Igor Mihajlovski, Macedonian basketball player
Ljubomir Mihajlovski (born 1954) Macedonian minister of internal affairs
Mihajlo Mihajlovski, Macedonian sport administrator
Toni Mihajlovski, Macedonian actor and stand up comedian
Zvonko Mihajlovski, Serbian sports television anchor

See also
Mihajlović

Surnames
Macedonian-language surnames